Shaun Francis Graf (born 19 May 1957) is a former Australian first-class cricketer who played 11 One Day Internationals (ODIs) for Australia in the early 1980s as an all-rounder. He represented Western Australia as well as his native Victoria in the Sheffield Shield and also played county cricket for Hampshire. He was part of Sheffield Shield-winning sides in 1979–80 (Victoria) and 1983–84 (Western Australia).

Biography
Graf was born in 1957 in Somerville, Victoria, Australia. Educated at St Bede's College, Graf made his grade debut at the age of 19 for St Kilda Cricket Club in the 1976–77 season as an all-rounder, bowling right-arm medium fast and batting left-handed with an emphasis on driving.

Graf travelled to England during 1979 and played for Wilshire in the Minor Counties competition. Highlights include 51 against Oxfordshire, 7–73 against Dorset and 79 and four wickets against Berkshire. He took 6–27 playing for the Gloucestershire Second XI.

1979–80 First Class Debut
Graf made his first-class debut in 1979–80 for Victoria.

He turned in a number of notable performances that season, including 3–24 against WA, 58 not out against WA, and seven wickets against South Australia.

Graf also had some good games in the McDonald's Cup. In his debut he took 1–44 and 19 not out against SA, helping Victoria win by three wickets. In the final he took 2–34, helping Victoria win the game and the championship. Victoria also won the Sheffield Shield that season.

In grade cricket, Graf took 4–54 and scored 93 helping St Kilda beat Melbourne. He took five wickets in the final but Footscray won the match.

1980 – Hampshire
Graf received an offer to play over the 1980 English summer with the Hampshire County Cricket Club. He performed disappointingly, scoring 214 runs at 19 and only exceeding 50 in a first-class game once, and taking only 16 first-class wickets at an average of 48 with best figures of 2–24. Highlights included 44 against Oxford, Hampshire came last that season. and 57 not out against Essex in his final county game.

His form was slightly better in one day games, taking 3–44 against Derbyshire, 2–12 against Somerset, 3–26 against Lancashire, and 2–24 against Essex.

He also had some good games for the Hampshire 2nd XI, taking five wickets and scoring 51 in one game.

1980–81 – International Player
Graf's first-class form was better in the Australian 1980–81 season. In his first Shield game, against WA, he scored 34 and 64 and took four wickets. He leapt into international consideration in another game against WA, scoring 100 not out and taking 3–24. In one day games he took 2–6 against Queensland.

Australia was looking for an all rounder and these efforts saw Graf named in the Test team for the second Test against the touring New Zealand. Graf wound up as 12th man though and did not play.

He was however selected to make his ODI debut in November 1980 against New Zealand at the Adelaide Oval.

"If we have a deficiency at the moment, it is possibly that we lack a true all-rounder", said Australian captain Greg Chappell at the time. "Shaun Graf is an up-and-comer in this area and he is possibly what Australia needs – not only in one day cricket but in Test matches as well".

Graf made a duck and took 1/40 in the match. He was kept on in the side for the next game, against New Zealand, taking 2–40. Against India he took 0–30 and scored 5. He took 0–15 against New Zealand and 2–23 against India.

Graf was dropped from the Australian Test team for the third Test against New Zealand due to a back injury, which saw him miss a Shield game; he was replaced by Trevor Chappell, who played as 12th man. Graf passed a fitness test and replaced Chappell for the first Test against India; however Graf was made 12th man again. He was replaced in the next test by Bruce Yardley.

In one day cricket Graf took 0–31 against India, 2–40 and 7 in a thrilling one run loss to New Zealand, scored 2 and took 1–36 against India and scored 2 against New Zealand.

Graf played in nine of Australia's ten group matches in that season's triangular ODI tournament, but was omitted from the team for the finals series after scoring just 16 runs at an average of 3.20 with a top score of 7 despite being picked as an all-rounder batting at number seven or eight. He did manage to take eight wickets at 31.88 in the series, with three two-wicket hauls. Towards the end of the summer he was dropped in favour of Graeme Beard.

Towards the end of the season, Graf took six wickets and scored 51 in a game against Queensland and 3–40 in a McDonald's Cup game. However his form was not particularly strong in other matches and he was overlooked for selection on the 1981 tour of England (Graeme Beard and Trevor Chappell went instead).

1981–82
The following season Graf's highlights include five wickets in a Shield game against Queensland and scores of 55 and 39 against NSW

Graf returned to the Australian one day side in the second and third matches of the ODI series, replacing an injured Dennis Lillee. He made his top score of eight against Pakistan at the Melbourne Cricket Ground, but after failing to take a wicket in that match, he conceded an expensive 56 runs in nine overs without success against the West Indies in the following match, and was dropped. He took 3–28 in a state one day game.

1982–83
Graf was unable to force his way back into the Australian one day side the following summer. He had his best first-class bowling returns to date against WA, taking 4–53 and 5–95. and played excellently in the McDonald's Cup semi final against WA, scoring 29 and taking 4–15. The majority of the rest of his performances were disappointing, however.

Graf returned to England for the 1983 English summer, playing for Cornwall in the Minor Counties Championship. Highlights include 7 wickets against Devon, 46 against Buckinghamshire, 62 and 56 against Cheshire, 60 against Shropshire, and 4–19 against Dorset.

1983–84 Move to WA
In 1983–84 he moved to Western Australia for one year, and was part of the winning Sheffield Shield team.

Highlights included 3–55 against WA, 54 and four wickets against Pakistan, scores of 34 and 73 plus three wickets in a narrow victory over Victoria, 74 and 31 not out against Queensland, and five wickets against Tasmania. In the final against Queensland, Graf took 3–111 and 3–34 and scored 14 and 17 not out; he was at the crease when WA won by four wickets. In the McDonald's Cup final, Graf's late innings knock of 37 off 33 balls brought WA within eight runs of victory.
 
Graf returned to Victoria the following season, playing one Shield game (scoring 49 and taking four wickets against Queensland) before retiring.

In all, he played 55 matches, scoring 1,559 runs at an average of 25.14 with one century, and claimed 124 wickets at an average of 33.91 with a best bowling of 5/95.

In limited overs matches, he averaged 25.22 with the bat and 25 with the ball.

Later career
He became a Victorian selector in 1990–91 and became the cricket operations manager of the Victorian Cricket Association in 1995.

Graf played grade cricket for St Kilda until the 1999–2000 season. St Kilda won the competition in 1984–85 and 1985–86 (Graf scored 58 in the final). They reached the final in 1989–90 after a semi final where Graf scored 53 and took 6–39; they lost the final despite Graf taking two wickets and scoring 102. They won the competition in 1991–92 with Graf taking 2–41 – Shane Warne was in the St Kilda team.

References 

 

1957 births
Living people
Australia One Day International cricketers
Hampshire cricketers
Victoria cricketers
Western Australia cricketers
Wiltshire cricketers
Cornwall cricketers
Australian cricketers
Cricketers from Melbourne